Affinisine is a monoterpenoid indole alkaloid which can be isolated from plants of the genus Tabernaemontana. Structurally, it can be considered a member of the sarpagine alkaloid family and may be synthesized from tryptophan via a Pictet-Spengler reaction.

Pharmacology
Limited pharmacological testing has indicated that affinisine may effectively inhibit acetylcholinesterase and butyrylcholinesterase.

See also
 Affinine
 19-Epivoacristine

References

Acetylcholinesterase inhibitors
Quinolizidine alkaloids
Indoles